The Kewaunee Power Station is a decommissioned nuclear power plant, located on a  plot in the town of Carlton, Wisconsin,  southeast of Green Bay, Wisconsin in Kewaunee County, and south of the city of Kewaunee.

KPS was the third nuclear power plant built in Wisconsin, and the 44th built in the United States. Due to falling electricity prices resulting from the falling price of natural gas, the plant ceased operation May 7, 2013.

In 2022, a sale of the plant was approved by the federal government. This was controversial because the sale affects what will be done with the trust money previously saved for the decommissioning, and who is responsible for any cost overruns. Although all fuel had already been placed in dry storage as of 2017, as of 2022 some radioactive waste still needed to be disposed of and the facility had not been dismantled.

History
The plant's original  operator was Wisconsin Public Service and it was owned by Wisconsin Public Service Corporation (59%) and Alliant Energy (41%).  From 2000 to July 2005, the plant was operated by Nuclear Management Company, of Hudson, Wisconsin. The plant is now owned by Dominion Resources of Richmond, Virginia. In 2008, Dominion applied to the Nuclear Regulatory Commission for an extension of its operating license for an additional 20 years.  The license was extended until 2033.

On April 27, 2006, there was a small water leak at the plant, though no radioactive material was released.

On October 22, 2012, Dominion Resources announced they would shut down and decommission the plant in mid-2013.  Dominion's chairman and CEO said "the decision was based purely on economics.  Dominion was not able to move forward with our plan to grow our nuclear fleet in the Midwest to take advantage of economies of scale".  Lower natural gas costs and resultant lower electricity prices created an electricity market in which the plant could not compete. The plant came offline permanently on May 7, 2013. Plans for decommissioning are uncertain: as a private owner rather than a public utility, Dominion cannot rely on charges imposed on utility customers by state regulators; however, the firm has a substantial reserve fund earmarked for this purpose and a cause of action against the Department of Energy for failure to remove spent fuel. There is also the chance that the energy market might improve due to economic or political changes.

The SAFSTOR (SAFe STORage) nuclear decommissioning option was selected. During SAFSTOR, the de-fuelled plant is monitored for up to sixty years before complete decontamination and dismantling of the site, to a condition where nuclear licensing is no longer required. During the storage interval, some of the radioactive contaminants of the reactor and power plant will decay, which will reduce the quantity of radioactive material to be removed during the final decontamination phase. A reduced workforce will move fuel assemblies from the reactor into the spent fuel pool.

On July 15, 2017, as part of decommissioning effort, the remaining fuel assemblies were successfully transferred to 24 Magnastor casks. Pool-to-pad work was completed in 23 weeks. The entire used fuel inventory from nearly four decades of electricity generation at Kewaunee is represented by the 24 Magnastor systems and 14 legacy Nuhoms systems.

As of December 2011, the Kewaunee decommissioning trust had approximately $517M in funds.

Dating back to 2001, peregrine falcons nested at the facility, near the top of the containment structure. At least 53 young were produced in that time (2.4 young per year). The nest was taken over by great horned owls in 2022 and has since been deconstructed.

Electrical Generation (Historical) 

* Power station went offline (start of decommissioning phase)

Description
This plant has one Westinghouse pressurized water reactor.

Surrounding population

The 2010 U.S. population within  of Kewaunee was 10,292, a decrease of 0.9 percent in a decade, according to an analysis of U.S. Census data for msnbc.com. The 2010 U.S. population within  was 776,954, an increase of 10.1 percent since 2000. Cities within 50 miles include Green Bay (26 miles to city center).

Seismic risk
The Nuclear Regulatory Commission's estimate of the risk each year of an earthquake intense enough to cause core damage to the reactor at Kewaunee was 1 in 83,333, according to an NRC study published in August 2010.

Gallery

Notes

External links

 kewauneesolutions.com, a website set up by the 2022 purchaser of the plant; link has unnarrated videos depicting the exterior and interior of the facility, including aerial videos

Energy infrastructure completed in 1974
Buildings and structures in Kewaunee County, Wisconsin
Former nuclear power stations in the United States
Nuclear power plants in Wisconsin
Alliant Energy
Former power stations in Wisconsin